Carteronius is a genus of African corinnid sac spiders first described by Eugène Simon in 1896.

Species
 it contains eight species:
Carteronius arboreus Bonaldo & Haddad, 2022 – DR Congo
Carteronius ashanti Bonaldo & Silva-Junior, 2022 – Ghana
Carteronius gentilis (Simon, 1909) – Cameroon, Equatorial Guinea
Carteronius lumumba Bonaldo & Ramírez, 2022 – Cameroon, Gabon, DR Congo
Carteronius myene Bonaldo & Labarque, 2022 – Gabon
Carteronius simoni Bonaldo & Shimano, 2022 – Gabon
Carteronius sudanus (Karsch, 1880) (type) – Guinea, Sierra Leone, Ivory Coast, Ghana, DR Congo
Carteronius teke Bonaldo & Bosselaers, 2022 – DR Congo

References

Araneomorphae genera
Spiders of Africa
Taxa named by Eugène Simon

Corinnidae